The United Nations Credentials Committee is a committee of the United Nations General Assembly whose main purpose is to report to the Assembly regarding the credentials of the body's representatives.

Background 
Each year before the regular session begins, the Office of Legal Affairs recommends a group of  candidates to the President of the General Assembly for the Credentials Committee. The President of the General Assembly then proposes nine candidates to the General Assembly, which then votes on the candidates.

According to Rule 27 of the Rules of Procedure of the General Assembly, Member States must send the credentials of their representatives to the Secretary-General of the United Nations more than one week before the opening of the regular session. When Members States send these credentials in, they are formally notifying the Secretary-General that these representatives are entitled to speak on their behalf. They must be sent by the Head of State, Head of Government or by the Minister for Foreign Affairs.

Rule 25 of the Rules of Procedure of the General Assembly also defines a “delegation” of a Member State as, "consist[ing] of up to five representatives, five alternate representatives, and as many advisers and experts as required." The General Assembly formally acknowledges the representatives of the Member States by approving their credentials.

In cases of special or emergency sessions of the General Assembly, as well as any as conferences convened under its authority, the credentials committee is reconvened with "the same composition as that of the Credentials Committee at its most recent regular session."

The consideration of the credentials by the Credentials Committee is normally a formality. However, if a delegation's legitimacy is contested, its credentials may be challenged by another Member State. In these cases, the office of the President of the General Assembly is often called upon to help resolve the matter before a formal meeting of the Credentials Committee. Nonetheless, delegations whose credentials have been challenged retain all their rights until, and unless, they are revoked by the General Assembly. An example is the Taliban government of Afghanistan. After having come to power in contested circumstances the month before, the new government sought to speak at the UN General Assembly before the close of its session in September 2021: the Credential Committee did not meet to agree to accept new Afghan appointments before the end of the session. This left Ghulam Isaczai of the ousted regime as the official representative to the UN, despite Taliban protestations that he "no longer represents Afghanistan". On December 1, 2021, the Committee voted to reject recognition of UN seats for both Afghanistan's Taliban government and Myanmar's ruling  Tatmadaw military junta.

Members 
The members of the Credentials Committee for the 76th Session of the General Assembly are:

 
 
 
  (permanent member)
 
  (permanent member)
 
 
  (permanent member)

References 

United Nations General Assembly subsidiary organs